Kirby Bedon is a hamlet in South Norfolk which lies approximately 3½ miles (5½ km) south-east of Norwich on the road to Bramerton.

The villages name means 'church farm/village'. The village was held by the Bidun family in the 12th century.

It has two churches, the ruined round-towered St Mary's Church and, standing opposite, St Andrew's church, which is still in use. St Andrew's contains a plaque erected by parishioners in memory of four crew members of "Broad and High", an American B-24 Liberator bomber who were killed when it crashed near the church on 18 August 1944 as it returned to Rackheath from a raid on Germany.

For one hundred years Kirby Bedon had a village school, which opened on 24 June 1878 and closed for the last time on 26 July 1978, a victim of the drive to close small village schools.

Kirby Bedon has a historic link to the transatlantic slave trade through Sir John Berney (1757-1825) of Kirby Bedon Hall. He was the owner of Hanson Plantation, Barbados.

The village no longer has a pub; the Stracey Arms on the main road from Norwich to Bramerton closed in 1967. It is now a Caravan Club certified location.

Kirby Bedon Church Hall was the home venue of Kirby Bedon Short Mat Bowls Club from the late 1980's to 2017 when it disbanded. They were a very successful side which won the Norfolk Summer League on many occasions as well as many other cups and titles. They were the winners of the first ever National Club Championships in 2009.

Kirby Bedon is linked to Norwich by bus route 85 operated by Our Bus providing nine services a day into Norwich and to the neighbouring villages of Bramerton, Surlingham and Rockland St Mary.

References

http://kepn.nottingham.ac.uk/map/place/Norfolk/Kirby%20Bedon

External links

St Mary's on the European Round Tower Churches website
 St Andrew's Church, Kirby Bedon 
 Kirby Bedon on GENUKI

Hamlets in Norfolk
Civil parishes in Norfolk